Fábio Júnior dos Santos (born 6 October 1982), commonly known as Fábio Júnior, is a Brazilian footballer who plays as a forward. He is a physically built striker who is good in the air and has a powerful left foot.

Club career 
2011

Egyptian club Al Ahly signed the forward from Portuguese side Naval, on 19 July 2011, on a three-year contract worth $1.2 million ($400,000 per season).

Fábio Júnior was signed in order to strengthen the forward line, which consisted of the already formidable duo of Mohamed Nagy "Geddo" and Dominique Da Silva. However, Junior found games hard to come by often being relegated to the bench (or not even featuring in the match line-up) by then coach Manuel José.

His first appearance would come in the CAF Champions League against MC Alger, replacing Emad Moteab in the 80th minute. Despite finding himself in a few scoring opportunities he was unable to grab a goal. It would be nearly two months before he made his long-awaited début in the Egyptian Premier League, coming on as a substitute against Haras El Hodood.

Fábio would finish the year having played four games for Ahly, but was unable to score a goal.

2012

The turn of the year represented a new beginning for Júnior, as he would feature in three consecutive games against: El Gounah, El Daklyeh and El Geish. He finally scored his debut goal on the 1 February 2012, against Al-Masry. However, the celebrations were short lived as the match was marred by riots after the final whistle. During the post-match clashes, he was not injured.

Fábio Júnior would mark his return to continental football by scoring the opening goal of the tie against Ethiopian Coffee, in the Round of 32 in the CAF Champions League. He later featured in the squad for both legs of the Round of 16 tie with Stade Malien, but was an unused substitute in both matches, with Ahly winning 3-2 on aggregate, to reach the Quarter-finals.

Honours 
Nacional Futebol Clube
 Campeonato Amazonense: 2000

Ceará Sporting Club
 Campeonato Cearense: 2002

Sport Club do Recife
 Campeonato Pernambucano: 2003

Madureira Esporte Clube
 Taça Rio: 2006

Al Ahly
 Egyptian Super Cup: 2012

References

External links 
 Fábio Júnior at Sambafoot
 

1982 births
Living people
Sportspeople from Sergipe
Brazilian footballers
Brazilian expatriate footballers
Association football forwards
Campinense Clube players
União São João Esporte Clube players
Nacional Futebol Clube players
Ceará Sporting Club players
Real Madrid Castilla footballers
Lorca Deportiva CF footballers
Sport Club Internacional players
Sport Club do Recife players
Jeonnam Dragons players
CR Flamengo footballers
Madureira Esporte Clube players
Associação Naval 1º de Maio players
CR Vasco da Gama players
Al Ahly SC players
Primeira Liga players
K League 1 players
Expatriate footballers in South Korea
Brazilian expatriate sportspeople in South Korea
Expatriate footballers in Portugal
Expatriate footballers in Egypt
Egyptian Premier League players